The High Commissioner of Australia to Canada is an officer of the Australian Department of Foreign Affairs and Trade and the head of the High Commission of the Commonwealth of Australia to Canada. The Australian High Commission also has responsibility for relations with Bermuda, a self-governing Overseas Territory of the United Kingdom. The position has the rank and status of an Ambassador Extraordinary and Plenipotentiary and is currently held by former senator Scott Ryan since 20 December 2021.

Australia and Canada have enjoyed official diplomatic relations since 12 September 1939, when high commissioners were first exchanged as Australia's second independent diplomatic posting established from 29 March 1940, with only the High Commission in London (1910) being older. As fellow Dominion countries, Australia and Canada had many prior contacts, particularly in trade, and continue to share a monarch as Commonwealth realms. The High Commissioner's Official Residence is located at Australia House, Ottawa, while the Chancery is located at the Sun Life Financial Centre, Suite 1301, 50 O'Connor Street, in Downtown Ottawa. The work of the High Commission is also supported by a Consulate-General in Toronto and an Honorary Consulate in Vancouver, which are run by Austrade.

Posting history
Formal diplomatic relations between Australia and Canada formally began on 12 September 1939 when the two countries agreed to exchange high commissioners. Australian representation in Canada prior to this was limited to a Trade Commissioner post with a focus on promoting trade, with Rupert Haynes, an Australian businessman connected to the South Australian fruit industry, appointed by the Minister for Markets and Transport as the first "Commercial Representative for the Commonwealth of Australia in the Dominion of Canada" on 1 April 1929. Haynes was recalled on 15 March 1930, and was later replaced by Lewis Richard Macgregor, who served until May 1938.

The first Canadian High Commissioner, Charles Jost Burchell, was appointed on 3 November 1939 and arrived in Australia on 27 December 1939.  On 23 December 1939, Prime Minister Robert Menzies announced the appointment of Sir Thomas Glasgow as the first Australian high commissioner. Glasgow arrived in Ottawa on 29 March 1940.

From 7 January 1974 to 1975, the High Commissioner had non-resident accreditation for Barbados, when it was transferred to the High Commissioner in Jamaica.

High Commissioners

Consulates

The work of the high commission is supported by a consulate-general in Toronto, which has been operated by the Australian Trade Commission (now Austrade) since 1929, and was upgraded to a consulate-general in 1975. The Honorary Consulate in Vancouver was originally established in 1947 as a Trade Commission and also upgraded to a consulate in 1975. There was also previously a consulate-general in Montreal from 1975 to its closure in 1976, having previously operated as a Trade Commission only since 1953.

See also
Australia-Canada relations
List of Canadian High Commissioners to Australia
Foreign relations of Australia

References

External links

Australian High Commission, Canada

Canada
 
Canada
Australia